Lee Howarth (born 3 January 1968) is an English former footballer who played in the Football League for Barnet, Mansfield Town and Peterborough United.

References

1968 births
Living people
English footballers
Association football defenders
English Football League players
People from Bolton
Chorley F.C. players
Peterborough United F.C. players
Kettering Town F.C. players
Boston United F.C. players
Mansfield Town F.C. players
Barnet F.C. players
Stevenage F.C. players
Bedford Town F.C. players
Deeping Rangers F.C. players